The 2006 Milton Keynes Council election took place on 4 May 2006 to elect members of Milton Keynes Unitary Council in Buckinghamshire, England. One third of the council was up for election and the Liberal Democrats lost overall control of the council to no overall control.

After the election, the composition of the council was:
Liberal Democrat 23
Labour 15
Conservative 13

Election result
The results saw the Liberal Democrats drop 4 seats to lose their majority on the council, while the Conservatives made gains.

Ward results

References

2006 English local elections
2006
2000s in Buckinghamshire